The 2nd Connecticut Infantry Regiment was an infantry regiment that served in the Union Army during the American Civil War.

Service
The 2nd Connecticut Infantry Regiment was organized at New Haven, Connecticut and mustered in for three-months service on May 7, 1861, under the command of Colonel Alfred Howe Terry.

The regiment was attached to Mansfield's command, Department of Washington, to June 1861. Key's 1st Brigade, Tyler's Division, McDowell's Army of Northeastern Virginia to August 1861.

The 2nd Connecticut Infantry mustered out of service on August 7, 1861.

Detailed service
Left Connecticut for Washington, D.C., May 19. Duty at Fort Corcoran, defenses of Washington, D.C., until June 1. Advanced to Vienna and Falls Church, Virginia, June 1–3, and picket duty there until July 16. Advanced on Manassas, Virginia, July 16–21. Occupation of Fairfax Court House July 17. Battle of Bull Run July 21.

Commanders
 Colonel Alfred Howe Terry

See also

 Connecticut in the American Civil War
 List of Connecticut Civil War units

References
 Dyer, Frederick H. A Compendium of the War of the Rebellion (Des Moines, IA:  Dyer Pub. Co.), 1908.
 Lucke, Jerome B. History of the New Haven Grays from Sept. 13, 1816, to Sept. 13, 1876 (New Haven, CT:  Tuttle, Morehouse & Taylor, Printers), 1876.
 Tyler, Elnathan B. "Wooden Nutmegs" at Bull Run: A Humorous Account of Some of the Exploits and Experiences of the Three Months Connecticut Brigade, and the Part They Bore in the National Stampede (Hartford, CT:  G. L. Coburn), 1872.
Attribution
 

Military units and formations established in 1861
Military units and formations disestablished in 1861
2nd Connecticut Infantry Regiment
1861 establishments in Connecticut